Nongsom-Foulbé is a village in the Kongoussi Department of Bam Province in northern Burkina Faso. As at 2005 it had a population of 187.

References

Populated places in the Centre-Nord Region
Bam Province